Kathleen Falk (born June 26, 1951) is an American attorney, politician, and policymaker from Wisconsin who served as Dane County Executive from 1997 until 2011. In 2013, she was appointed Regional Director of the U.S. Department of Health and Human Services, Region Five.

A Democrat, Falk unsuccessfully sought the party's nomination for Governor of Wisconsin in 2002 and in the 2012 recall election. In 2006, Falk defeated Democratic Attorney General Peg Lautenschlager to win the party's nomination for Attorney General, but was defeated by Republican J. B. Van Hollen in the general election.

Prior to running for elected office, Falk was a prosecutor and public-interest attorney.  From 1983 to 1997, she was an assistant attorney general and public intervenor in the Wisconsin Department of Justice; she previously worked as a co-director and legal counsel of Wisconsin's Environmental Decade, an advocacy organization. Falk is the only woman to serve as Dane County Executive and was the first woman to seek a major party's gubernatorial nomination in Wisconsin.

Early life and career
Falk was raised in Waukesha County, Wisconsin. She earned a bachelor's degree in philosophy from Stanford University in 1973 and graduated from the University of Wisconsin Law School in 1976. She is also a graduate of Harvard University's Senior Executives in State and Local Government Program.

Following law school, Falk became the co-director and general counsel of Wisconsin's Environmental Decade, Inc., a non-profit, public interest organization devoted to environmental litigation and lobbying. Falk argued cases before the Wisconsin Supreme Court during her tenure there.  In 1983, Falk was hired as an assistant attorney general in the Wisconsin Department of Justice. Attorney General Bronson La Follette appointed Falk to serve as Public Intervenor, in which capacity Falk performed litigation, lobbying, and advocacy on environmental protection matters. Falk's position was eliminated in 1995, during the tenure of Attorney General Jim Doyle, and Falk became an assistant attorney general at the department.

Political career

County executive (1997-2010)
Falk made her first run for public office in 1996, running for Dane County Executive. She finished first in the runoff and eventually defeated a long-time county board member, Mike Blaska. She was later re-elected three times (2001, 2005, 2009). During her 14-year tenure, she implemented mergers of county departments, vetoed borrowing for jail construction and ended Dane County's practice of sending its inmates to other counties for incarceration. Falk enlarged the county sheriff's department by adding 134 new positions, opened a juvenile justice facility, and launched a community-based initiative aimed at gang prevention. Falk's budgets funded jail diversion programs for non-violent substance-addicted offenders, a home visitation model for at-risk families, and environmental programs focused on water quality and land conservation.

Statewide office races
In 2002, she unsuccessfully ran for Governor, losing the Democratic primary to Jim Doyle. Falk was Wisconsin's first woman candidate for governor from a major political party. 

In 2006, Falk challenged and defeated Wisconsin's Attorney General in a Democratic primary election. She went on to lose the general election race by fewer than 9,000 votes out of more than 2.1 million cast. Falk was a contender to challenge Wisconsin Governor Scott Walker in his recall attempt. She announced her candidacy on January 18, 2012, but lost in the Democratic gubernatorial primary to Tom Barrett.

Later career 
Falk stepped down as county executive in April 2010, citing an interest in contributing to public policy in a new way. Her tenure as county executive was the longest in the office's history.

U.S. Department of Health & Human Services (2013-2017)
In September 2013, U.S. Department of Health and Human Services Secretary Kathleen Sebelius appointed Falk to serve as DHHS's Region V Director. Region V encompasses a six-state area that includes Indiana, Illinois, Michigan, Minnesota, Ohio and Wisconsin.

Recognition
Falk has received awards and recognition from environmental groups, business interests, women's organizations, LGBT equality activists, advocates for the disabled, conservation groups, the American Legion and domestic violence support groups.

In 2014, the Dane County Board and County Executive named a wildlife area along the Sugar River the Falk-Wells Sugar River Wildlife Area for Falk and her chief of staff, Topf Wells, in recognition of their commitment to preserving the county's natural resources.

Falk was inducted into the Wisconsin Conservation Hall of Fame in 2022.

Personal life 
Falk is married to former Democratic State Representative Peter Bock. She has one son, Eric Phillips, and is an avid baseball fan, bicyclist, hunter, and angler.

Electoral history

Notes

External links
Biography at the Department of Health and Human Services

1951 births
Living people
Stanford University alumni
Politicians from Milwaukee
University of Wisconsin Law School alumni
Wisconsin Democrats
Dane County Executives
Lawyers from Milwaukee
Women in Wisconsin politics
21st-century American women